Cheryl Phillips may refer to:

Cheryl Phillips (journalist), data journalist and professor
Cheryl Phillips (politician) (born 1962) South African politician